Charles "Chuck" Riggs (born August 5, 1951) is an American jazz drummer.

Early life 
Riggs was born in Westerly, Rhode Island.

Career 
Riggs played with Scott Hamilton for many years beginning in 1976; their association lasted well into the 1990s. In the late 1970s and 1980s, he played with Bob Wilber, the World's Greatest Jazz Band, Chris Flory, Benny Goodman, Kenny Davern and Dick Wellstood, Flip Phillips, Ruby Braff, and Jay McShann. He was a member of the Concord Jazz All-Stars (alongside Hamilton, Dave McKenna, and Gray Sargent) in the early 1990s, and worked later in the 1990s with Keith Ingham, Jon-Erik Kellso, and Ken Peplowski.

Riggs was featured on The Cotton Club, the soundtrack for the 1984 film of the same name.

References
Footnotes

General references
Gary W. Kennedy, "Chuck Riggs". The New Grove Dictionary of Jazz. 2nd edition, ed. Barry Kernfeld.

American jazz drummers
Musicians from Rhode Island
1951 births
Living people
20th-century American drummers
American male drummers
20th-century American male musicians
American male jazz musicians
World's Greatest Jazz Band members

People from Westerly, Rhode Island